Onshape is a computer-aided design (CAD) software system, delivered over the Internet via a software as a service (SAAS) model. It makes extensive use of cloud computing, with compute-intensive processing and rendering performed on Internet-based servers, and users are able to interact with the system via a web browser or the iOS and Android apps. As a SAAS system, Onshape upgrades are released directly to the web interface, and the software does not require maintenance work from the user.

Onshape allows teams to collaborate on a single shared design, the same way multiple writers can work together editing a shared document via cloud services. It is primarily focused on mechanical CAD (MCAD) and is used for product and machinery design across many industries, including consumer electronics, mechanical machinery, medical devices, 3D printing, machine parts, and industrial equipment.

Company history

Onshape was developed by a company with the same name.  Founded in 2012, Onshape was based in Cambridge, Massachusetts (USA), with offices in Singapore and Pune, India. Its leadership team includes several engineers and executives who originated SolidWorks, a popular 3D CAD program that runs on Microsoft Windows. Onshape’s co-founders include two former SolidWorks CEOs, Jon Hirschtick and John McEleney.

 In November 2012, former SolidWorks CEOs Jon Hirschtick and John McEleney led six co-founders launching Belmont Technology, a placeholder name that was later changed to Onshape. The company’s first round of funding was $9 million from North Bridge Venture Partners and Commonwealth Capital.
 In March 2015, Onshape released the public beta version of its cloud CAD software, after pre-production testing with more than a thousand CAD professionals in 52 countries. Included in the beta launch was Onshape for iPhone.
 In August 2015, the company released its Onshape for Android app.
 In December 2015, Onshape launched its full commercial release. The company also launched the Onshape App Store, offering CAM, simulation, rendering and other cloud-based engineering tools. The Onshape App Store was launched with 24 developer partners.
 In April 2016, Onshape introduced its Education Plan, with a free version of Onshape Professional geared for college students and educators.
 In May 2016, Onshape released FeatureScript, a new open source (MIT licensed) programming language for creating and customizing CAD features.
In October 2019, Onshape agreed to be acquired by PTC. The acquisition closed in November 2019 for $470 million.

Funding
Onshape was a venture-backed company with investments from firms including Andreessen Horowitz, Commonwealth Capital Ventures, New Enterprise Associates (NEA) and North Bridge Venture Partners. Total venture funding amounted to $169 million.

Supported file formats

Modelling

Importing 
As of April 2022, the Onshape supported importing (opening) the following common CAD file formats:

 STEP (ISO 10303)
 ISO JT (ISO 14306)
 Parasolid XT
 ACIS
 IGES
 CATIA v4, v5, v6
 Autodesk Inventor
 Part (.IPT)
 Assembly (.IAM)
 Presentation (.IPN)
 Drawing (.IDW, .DXF/.DWG)
 Pro/ENGINEER, Creo
 Rhinoceros 3D: .3dm 
 .STL
 .OBJ
 SolidWorks file formats
 Siemens NX file formats

Exporting 
Onshape supports exporting to the following formats:

 STEP (ISO 10303)
 Parasolid XT
 ACIS
 IGES
 SolidWorks file formats
 .STL
 Rhinoceros 3D: .3dm 
 Collada XML-spec based textual file

Drawing 
Ordinary engineering or technical drawing can be exported as .PDF file.

Assembly 

Assemblies can be imported and exported to: 

 STEP (ISO 10303)
 Parasolid XT
 ACIS
 Pro/ENGINEER, Creo
 ISO JT
 Rhinoceros 3D: .3dm 
 Siemens NX file formats
 SolidWorks Pack and Go zip file

File formats that assemblies can be only-exported to, are:

 IGES
 .STL
 Collada XML-spec based textual file

See also 

 Comparison of CAD software

References

Cloud computing
Solid mechanics
Product design
Computer-aided engineering software
2015 software
IOS software
Android (operating system) software
Linux software
MacOS computer-aided design software
Computer-aided design software for Windows